The Daskal Philip Psalter is a 17th-century Bulgarian illuminated psalter. It was produced in 1692.

Analysis
The psalter, is written in Middle Bulgarian Cyrillic and contains the text of the Psalms copied by the Bulgarian daskal Philip. Of particular importance is the miniature of King David.
The pages have dimensions 20.5 х 14 centimeters.

The manuscript is part of the collection of the Library of the University of Sofia "St. Clement of Ohrida" in Sofia.

See also
 Sofia Psalter, c. 1337
 Tomić Psalter, c. 1360
 Gospels of Tsar Ivan Alexander, 1355–1356

References
Psalter, Daskal Philip, europeana
Псалтир на даскал Филип, Psalter of Daskal Philip

External links

Illuminated psalters
Medieval Bulgarian literature
1692 works
History of Sofia
Bulgarian art